Photoscotosia is a genus of moths in the family Geometridae described by Warren in 1862.

Species
Some species in this genus are:
Photoscotosia albapex Hampson, 1895 (India)
Photoscotosia amplicata (Walker, 1862) (India)
Photoscotosia annubilata Prout, 1940 (India)
Photoscotosia atromarginata Warren, 1893 (India)
Photoscotosia atrostrigata (Bremer, 1864)
Photoscotosia dejuncta Prout, 1937 (India)
Photoscotosia fulguritis Warren, 1893 (India)
Photoscotosia insularis Bastelberger, 1909
Photoscotosia metachryseis Hampson, 1896 (India)
Photoscotosia miniosata (Walker, 1862) (India)
Photoscotosia multilinea Warren, 1893 (India)
Photoscotosia nubilata Moore, 1888 (India)
Photoscotosia obliquisignata Moore, 1867 (India)
Photoscotosia pamirica (Viidalepp, 1988)
Photoscotosia palaearctica (Staudinger, 1882) (northern China)
Photoscotosia stigmatica Warren, 1894
Photoscotosia undulosa (Alpheraky, 1888) (India)

References

Larentiini